Germán Luján Lauro (born 2 April 1984) is an Argentine shot putter and discus thrower. He is the South American record holder in the shot put both indoors and outdoors with marks of 21.04 m and 21.26 m, respectively. His personal best in the discus is 63.55 metres.

Lauro placed sixth in the shot put at the 2012 IAAF World Indoor Championships and the 2012 Olympic Games. He represented his country at the World Championships in Athletics in 2007, 2009 and 2011, although he did not reach the finals. He also competed at the 2008 Beijing Olympics and is a two-time participant at the Pan American Games.

He gradually emerged at the regional level, winning South American youth, junior and under-23 titles. He reached the top of his field at continental level in 2006 with a gold medal in the shot put at the South American Championships in Athletics. He extended his shot put reign with four wins from 2006 to 2011 and won two discus gold medals (2007 and 2009) before taking silver in 2011. He began to make an impact at a greater regional level from 2010 onwards, taking a shot put bronze at the 2011 Pan American Games and two gold medals at the 2012 Ibero-American Championships in Athletics. In 2010 he won the Konex Award as one of the five best Athletes of the last decade in Argentina.

Career

Early career
Germán Lauro was born on 2 April 1984 in Trenque Lauquen in Argentina's Buenos Aires Province. He is a member of the local sports club, Foot Ball Club Argentino. He began training with Carlos Llera, a physical education teacher, while at high school in his home town.

In his first continental competition he won both the shot put and discus throw events at the 2000 South American Youth Championships in Athletics. He also placed seventh in the discus in the Junior Championships that year. His first junior medal came the following year at the 2001 Pan American Junior Athletics Championships, where he was the discus silver medallist behind Héctor Hurtado. He was seventh in the shot put at the 2001 South American Junior Championships in Athletics and a finalist at the 2001 World Youth Championships in Athletics.

He competed for Argentina in the discus at the 2002 World Junior Championships in Athletics, but didn't make the final round, although he was the shot put and discus runner-up at the South American Juniors (second to Brazil's Gustavo de Mendonça both times). In his final junior year he placed fifth in the discus and twelfth in the shot put at the 2003 Pan American Junior Athletics Championships. He managed only fourth in the shot and third in the discus at the 2003 South American Junior Championships in Athletics.

First senior medals
He achieved little progress in his first senior year, with his sole medal (a bronze) coming in the discus at the 2004 South American Under-23 Championships in Athletics. He improved his shot put best to 18.17 metres the next year and placed fourth in the event at the 2005 South American Championships in Athletics.

The 2006 season saw Lauro establish himself in the shot put at the senior level as he began to make effective use of the spin technique. After a fourth-place finish at the 2006 Ibero-American Championships in Athletics he broke the Argentine record for the event with a throw of 19.46 m. At the 2006 South American Championships in Athletics he had a no throw in the discus but excelled in the shot put, taking the gold medal with a mark of 18.97 m. A South American under-23 record of 19.78 m came at that year's South American U23 Championships, where he won both the shot put and discus titles. He also extended his personal best in the discus to 60.30 m, clearing sixty metres for the first time.

He expanded his regional dominance to the discus at the 2007 South American Championships in Athletics, winning both the shot put and discus gold medals. He was a finalist in both events at the 2007 Pan American Games, coming fifth in the shot put and fourth in the discus. His global senior debut followed at the 2007 World Championships in Athletics, although he was eliminated in the first round. A throw of 61.78 m in Buenos Aires marked a season-ending personal best in the discus. He began 2008 in strong form, throwing a national record of 19.88 m for the shot put in February. A bronze medal in the event followed at the 2008 Ibero-American Championships in Athletics, where he was also fourth in the discus. On his Olympic debut at the 2008 Beijing Games he was knocked out in the qualifying rounds.

Further regional titles
Lauro defended his shot put and discus titles at the 2009 South American Championships in Athletics, having his season's best marks of 19.20 m and 60.41 m there. He gained selection for both events at the 2009 World Championships in Athletics, but did not make the final in either event. With few major international events in 2010, his focus that year was the Ibero-American Championships. He was fourth in the discus but reached new distances in the shot put event, taking the silver medal with a significant improvement to 20.43 m. He was only beaten by Marco Fortes in the last series of throws.

The 2011 South American Championships in Athletics was hosted in his home capital Buenos Aires and he defended his shot put title on the first day of competition. Lauro was dethroned in the discus, however, as he finished runner-up to Brazil's Ronald Julião. He represented Argentina in the first round of the shot put at the 2011 World Championships in Athletics, but the peak of his season came at the 2011 Pan American Games, where he won the bronze medal with a throw of 20.41 m.

South American records
Lauro took the indoor circuit for the first time at the start of 2012. He had national indoor records of 19.86 m, then 19.89 m. A South American indoor record of 20.40 m followed in the first round of the 2012 IAAF World Indoor Championships and he finished sixth in the final round – the best global placing of his career at that point. In the outdoor season he threw a national record of 20.43 m in Mar de Plata and claimed a shot put/discus double at the 2010 Ibero-American Championships in Athletics, which included a discus best of 63.55 m. This qualified him for the events at the 2012 London Olympics and in the Olympic shot put he threw 20.75 m in qualifying before hurling a personal best of 20.84 m in the final to finish in sixth place. He performed less well in the discus, finishing 37th in qualifying.

He improved his shot put best further at the start of the next season with marks of 20.89 m and 20.98 m in Argentina. At the Doha leg of the 2013 Diamond League he threw a South American record of 21.26 metres, taking second place in the shot put.

Personal bests
Shot put: 21.26 m –  Doha, 10 May 2013
Discus throw: 63.55 m –  Barquisimeto, 8 June 2012

Achievements

References

External links
 
 
 
 
 

1984 births
Living people
Argentine male discus throwers
Argentine male shot putters
Athletes from Buenos Aires
Olympic athletes of Argentina
Athletes (track and field) at the 2008 Summer Olympics
Athletes (track and field) at the 2012 Summer Olympics
Athletes (track and field) at the 2016 Summer Olympics
Pan American Games bronze medalists for Argentina
Pan American Games medalists in athletics (track and field)
Athletes (track and field) at the 2007 Pan American Games
Athletes (track and field) at the 2011 Pan American Games
Athletes (track and field) at the 2015 Pan American Games
Medalists at the 2011 Pan American Games
Medalists at the 2015 Pan American Games
South American Games gold medalists for Argentina
South American Games silver medalists for Argentina
South American Games bronze medalists for Argentina
South American Games medalists in athletics
Competitors at the 2002 South American Games
Competitors at the 2006 South American Games
Competitors at the 2014 South American Games
World Athletics Championships athletes for Argentina